Dhanwan may refer to:
Dhanwan (1937 film), a 1937 Hindi social film
Dhanwan (1946 film), a 1946 Bollywood film
Dhanwan (1981 film), a 1981 Hindi film
Dhanwan (1993 film), a 1993 Indian romance film